The 1999 Atlantic 10 Conference Baseball Championship was held at Bear Stadium in Boyertown, Pennsylvania from May 20 through 22. It was the 12th time was held in Boyertown, where it was previously held from 1987 to 1997. It featured the top two regular-season finishers of each of the conference's six-team divisions. West Division top seed Virginia Tech defeated La Salle in the title game to win the tournament for the second time, earning the Atlantic 10's automatic bid to the 1999 NCAA Tournament.

Seeding and format 
Each division's top teams, based on winning percentage in the 21-game regular season schedule, qualified for the field. In the four-team double-elimination format, the East Division champion played the West Division runner-up, and vice versa. In the West Division, conference tiebreaking rules gave La Salle received the second seed in the four-way tie for second place.

Bracket

All-Tournament Team 
The following players were named to the All-Tournament Team. Virginia Tech's Larry Bowles, one of six Hokies selected, was named Most Outstanding Player.

Virginia Tech's Barry Gauch was named for the third time. He was the Most Outstanding Player in 1997 and also named in 1998. The Hokies' Matt Griswold was named for the second time, after also being selected in 1997.

References 

Tournament
Atlantic 10 Conference Baseball Tournament
Atlantic 10 Conference baseball tournament
Atlantic 10 Conference baseball tournament
Baseball in Pennsylvania
College sports in Pennsylvania
History of Berks County, Pennsylvania
Sports competitions in Pennsylvania
Sports in the Delaware Valley
Tourist attractions in Berks County, Pennsylvania